Modris Liepiņš (born 3 August 1966 in Tukums) is a Latvian race walker.

Achievements

References

1966 births
Living people
People from Tukums
Latvian male racewalkers
Athletes (track and field) at the 1996 Summer Olympics
Athletes (track and field) at the 2000 Summer Olympics
Athletes (track and field) at the 2004 Summer Olympics
Olympic athletes of Latvia
Latvian male marathon runners
Latvian Academy of Sport Education alumni